Luisella Boni (born 24 July 1935) is an Italian actress.

Born in Como, Lombardy as Luisa Angela Bozzo, Boni debuted in 1952 in Bernard Vorhaus' film Finishing School.
One of the most active actresses in Italian cinema between the early fifties and mid-sixies, she slowed her activity after her marriage to television director Daniele D'Anza in 1965. In the 1960s she was sometimes credited as Brigitte Corey.
 
She was also active on television and on stage.

Selected filmography 

 Finishing School (1953)
 Cavalcade of Song  (1953)
 Frine, Courtesan of Orient (1953) - Touni
 The Treasure of Bengal (1953) - Karma
 Love in the City (1953)
 A Slice of Life (1954) - (segment "Scena all'aperto")
 Papà Pacifico (1954) - Maria Grazia - Luisa's friend
 Orphan of the Ghetto (1954) - Viola
 Eighteen Year Olds (1955) - Luisa
 Land of the Pharaohs (1955) - Kyra
 Nana (1955) - Estelle
 Il piccolo vetraio (1955) - Gisella
 La trovatella di Milano (1956) - Maria
 Whom God Forgives (1957) - María
 Le belle dell'aria (1957) 
 The Angel of the Alps (1957) - Rina
 Un amore senza fine (1958)
 Tabarin (1958) - Simone
 Sergente d'ispezione (1958) - Viviani
 Cavalier in Devil's Castle (1959) - Contessa Isabella
 I mafiosi (1959) - Caterina
 Attack of the Moors (1959) - Annette
 Avventura in città (1959) - Wanda
 Il conquistatore di Maracaibo (1961) - Altagracia
 Gefährliche Reise (1961)
 Samson (1961) - Janine
 Fra Manisco cerca guai... (1961) - Maria
 The Invincible Gladiator (1961)
 The Fury Of Hercules (1962) - Daria 
 Sfida nella città dell'oro (1962) - Sabina Brand
 Between Shanghai and St. Pauli (1962) - Diana
 The Old Testament (1962) - (scenes deleted)
 The Shortest Day (1963) - Una crocerossina (uncredited)
 Lontano da dove (1983) - Eleonora Serpieri Altobilli
 Un'età da sballo (1983)
 Caterina in the Big City (2003) - Andreina, madre di Gianfilippo
 Studio illegale (2013) - Moglie Carugato

References

External links  

 

1935 births
Living people
People from Como
Italian film actresses 
Italian stage actresses
Italian television actresses